Toribío is a town and municipality in Cauca Department, Colombia.

References

External links
Toribio official website

Municipalities of Cauca Department